Kameron Woods (born April 22, 1993) is an American professional basketball coach who is the head coach of the Oklahoma City Blue of the NBA G League. He played college basketball for the Butler Bulldogs. He spent two seasons playing professional basketball for the Oklahoma City Blue before transitioning into a coaching position with the Blue and the Oklahoma City Thunder.

College career
Woods spent four seasons as a member of the Butler Bulldogs. In his first collegiate game, he came off the bench and recorded five points against the Louisville Cardinals. As a freshmen, he averaged 4.2 points and 4.8 rebounds per game. As a junior, he became a starter and led Butler and the Big East in rebounding. On January 9, 2014, Woods put up 17 points and 14 rebounds in a 94-99 loss to the DePaul Blue Demons. At the end of his collegiate career, Woods left Butler as the leader in blocked shots for four straight seasons and second all-time leading rebounder at Butler.

Professional career

Oklahoma City Blue (2015-2017)
After going undrafted in the 2015 NBA Draft, Woods joined the Oklahoma City Blue for the 2015-16 NBA D League season. When Woods started his D League career, he told himself he would play for two seasons and re-evaluate how close he was to the NBA. 

In his first season with the Blue, he averaged 4.7 points, 5.2 rebounds in 49 appearances which included an 11 point, 15 rebound performance in a 90-94 loss to the South Bay Lakers. Woods joined the Oklahoma City Thunder for the 2016 NBA Summer League. In his summer league stint, Woods appeared in four games averaging 12 minutes. In his second season, he averaged a new career high in games started and minutes while averaging 4.5 points, 4.5 rebounds, and 1.5 assists. Following the season, Woods realized he "wasn't where [he] wanted to be." and did not return to the Blue for a third season and instead moved to Atlanta and becoming an IT recruiter.

Coaching career
In 2018, Woods returned to the Oklahoma City Blue as an assistant coach under head coach Mark Daigneault for the 2018-19 season. When Daigneault was promoted to the Thunder as an assistant coach, Woods was retained by incoming head coach Grant Gibbs for his second season. Woods was promoted to the Thunder as a player development coach for the 2020-21 season under Daigneault's first year as head coach.

On September 23, 2022, the Thunder named Woods the new head coach of the Oklahoma City Blue following Grant Gibbs's promotion to the Thunder coaching staff. Woods previously served as the head coach for the Thunder in the 2022 NBA Summer League in Salt Lake City and Las Vegas leading Oklahoma City to a 5-3 record. On November 4, 2022, the Blue opened up their season against G League Ignite that saw the Blue winning 134-125, after trailing by 28 points to give Woods's his first career win.

Career statistics

College career

|-
| style="text-align:left;"|2011–12
| style="text-align:left;"|Butler
| 36 || 5 || 17.6 || .370 || .180 || .605 || 4.8 || .6 || .4 || 1.1 || 4.2
|-
| style="text-align:left;"|2012–13
| style="text-align:left;"|Butler
| 36 || 0 || 17.0 || .547 || .250 || .654 || 4.9 || .8 || .6 || .7 || 4.5
|-
| style="text-align:left;"|2013–14
| style="text-align:left;"|Butler
| 30 || 30 || 33.4 || .448 ||  || .657 || 9.0 || 2.0 || .9 || 1.0 || 7.5
|-
| style="text-align:left;"|2014–15
| style="text-align:left;"|Butler
| 34 || 34 || 31.3 || .506 ||  || .659 || 9.9 || 1.1 || 1.2 || .9 || 7.8
|- class="sortbottom"
| style="text-align:center;" colspan="2"|Career
| 136 || 69 || 24.4 || .464 || .185 || .650 || 7.2 || 1.1 || .8 || .9 || 5.9

NBA G League

|-
| style="text-align:left;"|2015–16
| style="text-align:left;"|Oklahoma City
| 49 || 14 || 21.8 || .480 || .383 || .679 || 5.2 || .9 || .5 || .7 || 4.7
|-
| style="text-align:left;"|2016–17
| style="text-align:left;"|Oklahoma City
| 50 || 29 || 25.5 || .401 || .235 || .640 || 4.5 || 1.5 || .7 || .5 || 4.5
|- class="sortbottom"
| style="text-align:center;" colspan="2"|Career
| 99 || 43 || 23.7 || .436 || .298 || .660 || 4.9 || 1.2 || .6 || .6 || 4.6

References

External links
 Kameron Woods bio
 College statistics

1993 births
Living people
American men's basketball players
Basketball players from Kentucky
Basketball coaches from Kentucky
Butler Bulldogs men's basketball players
Oklahoma City Blue coaches
Oklahoma City Blue players
Oklahoma City Thunder assistant coaches